Star Cave is an unincorporated community in Wythe County, Virginia, United States. The community is situated on Gardner Road just east of the New River.

References

Unincorporated communities in Wythe County, Virginia
Unincorporated communities in Virginia